Mangsong Mangtsen, Trimang Löntsen or Khri-mang-slon-rtsan (r. 655–676 CE) succeeded to the throne after the death of his Father Gungsong Gungtsen. or, his grandfather, Songtsen Gampo, its Dispute of Succession however he was the third or, second emperor of the newly created Tibetan Empire.

As Songtsen Gampo's only son had died early, he was succeeded by his infant grandson Mangsong Mangsten. Real power was left in the hands of the minister Gar Tongtsen (Mgar-srong-rtsan, or sometimes just mGar).

Political and military activities

Relations between China and Tibet began to sour during this reign as he began to expand into Tang China's territory. In 658 Mangsong "again" sent presents to the Chinese emperor asking for a princess to marry, but this request was refused.

He then consolidated Tibet's hold over the whole of the Tibetan plateau controlling both the 'Aza in the east and Zhang Zhung in the west. But, by 658 China had gained control of both Khotan and Kucha and established protectorates as far as Sogdia and Kashmir.

Sometime prior to 662 Mangsong had allied himself with the Western Turks and together they began raiding Tang protectorates. They attacked Kashgar in 663, and Khotan in 665. In 667 the Turkic Nushibi of the On oq submitted to Tibet, which also controlled the strategic Wakhan valley.

Between 665 and 670 Khotan was defeated by the Tibetans, and a long string of conflicts ensued with the Chinese Tang dynasty. In the spring of 670, Tibet attacked the remaining Chinese territories in the western Tarim Basin (see Battle of Dafei River). With troops from Khotan they conquered Aksu, upon which the Chinese abandoned the region, ending two decades of Chinese control. They thus gained control over all of the Chinese Four Garrisons of Anxi in the Tarim Basin in 670 and held them until 692, when the Chinese finally managed to regain these territories.

Death and succession

According to the Tibetan Annals, Mangsong Mangsten died in 676 but some sources say the Tibetans kept the death a secret for three years so that the Chinese would not be aware they were without a leader. The Chinese record his death in 679. He was buried in the royal burial grounds near Yarlung.

He was followed by his young son, Tridu Songtsen. The Tang Annals say 'Dus-srong was eight years old (i.e. nine years old by Western reckoning) in 679. He was, therefore, presumably born in 670. Due to his young age he was enthroned with the minister Gar Tongtsen's second son, Khri-'bring, to act as regent.

Footnotes

References
 Bacot, Thomas and Toussaint. (1940–1946). Documents de Touen-houang relatifs a l'histoire de Tibet. J. Bacot, F. W. Thomas, Ch. Touissant. Paris. Libraire orientaliste Paul Geunther.
Choephel, Gedun. (1978). The White Annals. Library of Tibetan Works & Archives Dharamsala, H.P., India.
Dotson (2009). Brandon  Dotson. The Old Tibetan Annals: An Annotated Translation of Tibet's First History. VÖAW, Austria.  (book);  (online edition).

Tibetan emperors
Buddhist monarchs
7th-century rulers in Asia
Tibetan Buddhists
7th-century Tibetan people
7th-century births
676 deaths
Child monarchs from Asia
Year of birth unknown
7th-century Buddhists